Jacobus Linthorst (1745 – 7 August 1815) was a painter from the Northern Netherlands.

Linthorst was born in Amsterdam where he is known for fruit and flower arrangements as interior decorations as well as paintings.
He was a follower of Rachel Ruysch and Jan van Huysum. He became a member of the Amsterdam guild of St. Luke on 6 June 1789.
Linthorst died in Amsterdam.

References

1745 births
1815 deaths
18th-century Dutch painters
18th-century Dutch male artists
Dutch male painters
Painters from Amsterdam